Vågakallen is a mountain in Vågan Municipality in Nordland county, Norway. It has a height of 942 or 943 m.a.s.l., and is located in the island of Austvågøy in the Lofoten archipelago. The mountain was first ascended by Martin Hoff Ekroll about 1885.

References

Mountains of Nordland
Vågan
Lofoten